Maor Melikson (or Melicsohn, ; born ) is an Israeli former  association footballer who played as a winger for the Israel national team. As a result of injury he announced his retirement on 1 January 2020.

Early life
Melikson was born in Yavne, Israel, to Ashkenazi Jewish parents. His father was born in Romania, whereas his mother was born in Legnica, Poland, and both immigrated to Israel separately at young age.

He also holds a Polish passport, on account of his mother's birthplace.

Club career

Israel
Born in Yavne, Melikson started in the youth department of Maccabi Yavne. During the 2001–02 season, he made his senior debut in Liga Alef in a match against Ironi Ramat HaSharon. At the end of that season Maccabi Yavne were relegated to Liga Bet, and Melikson moved to Beitar Jerusalem. At the end of 2005–06 season after not reaching a financial settlement with Beitar, Melikson decided to join Ligat ha'Al champions, Maccabi Haifa on a three-year contract. During the 2007–08 season, Maccabi Haifa sold Melikson to Hapoel Kfar Saba. After just six months which included a relegation to Liga Leumit, he signed in June 2008 a five-year contract with Hapoel Be'er Sheva, and later was appointed as the team captain.

Wisła Kraków

On 31 January 2011, Melikson joined Polish Ekstraklasa side Wisła Kraków on a four-and-a-half-year deal for an undisclosed fee from Hapoel Be'er Sheva. He won the Ekstraklasa championship in his debut season. He was also named the Ekstraklasa Revelation of the Season, even though he only played for one half of the season. On 27 July, Melikson scored his first goal in European Cups in the first leg of a UEFA Champions League third qualifying round match against Litex Lovech, giving a vital 2–1 win to Wisła. Melikson scored again twice in the second leg and helped Wisła secure qualification for the play-off round, where they eventually lost to APOEL. He picked up an injury in September's league match against Ruch Chorzów, which ruled him out of play until December. Melikson returned to play the last two UEFA Europa League group stage matches and helped his team to qualify for the round of 32. He was chosen the biggest discovery of Ekstraklasa by other players in Polish Footballers' Association voting, as well as named to the Ekstraklasa Best XI in 2011.

Valenciennes
On 15 January 2013, Melikson joined Ligue 1 club Valenciennes on a two-and-a-half-year deal for an undisclosed fee from Wisła Kraków. He made his debut on 25 January in a 2–0 loss against Lyon, coming on as a substitute in the second half.

Return to Beer Sheva
On 10 July 2014, it was announced that Melikson would return to Beer Sheva.

International career
Melikson played in Israel national under-21 football team for several years, and helped the team qualify for the 2007 UEFA Under-21 Championship, but missed out on the final tournament due to injury.

He made his debut for the Israeli senior national team in a friendly match against Uruguay on 26 May 2010. On 10 August 2011, in his second appearance for the national side Melikson scored two goals for Israel in the 4–3 loss against Ivory Coast.

On 20 September 2011, the Polish Football Association chairman Grzegorz Lato revealed that Melikson in a conversation with him expressed his desire to play for the Poland national football team. Melikson is eligible to play for Poland based on a FIFA ruling allowing players to switch their national teams if the player had not yet played in an official FIFA competitive match with the senior team despite having played at the youth level. The next day, Israel Football Association issued a statement that Melikson is a member of Israel national football team and he is called for the upcoming match against Malta in the last fixture of the UEFA Euro 2012 qualifying phase. Melikson, however, refrained from making any comment for the Polish media, but Wisła Kraków manager Robert Maaskant confirmed his intentions to switch to Poland national team. Later Melikson said to Israeli media that he chose to play for Poland, but subsequently on 22 September declared that he has decided not to play for either national side for the time being. In January 2012 Melikson met with the new coach of Israel national team, Eli Guttman, and declared his desire to continue playing for Israel.

In his first appearance in 2012, Melikson assisted Ben Sahar's goals in a 3–2 home loss to Ukraine in a friendly match.

Career statistics

Club

International goals
Scores and results list Israel's goal tally first, score column indicates score after each Melikson goal.

Honours

Club
Hapoel Be'er Sheva
Toto Cup Second League: 2008-09
State Cup Runners-up : 2014–15
Israeli Premier League: 2015–16, 2016-17, 2017-18
Israel Super Cup: 2016, 2017

Wisła Kraków
Ekstraklasa: 2010–11

Individual
 Ekstraklasa Revelation of the Season: 2010–11
 The biggest discovery of Ekstraklasa: 2011
 Ekstraklasa Best XI: 2011, 2012

References

External links
 
 Stats at IFA

1984 births
Living people
Israeli Ashkenazi Jews
Israeli footballers
Maccabi Yavne F.C. players
Beitar Jerusalem F.C. players
Maccabi Haifa F.C. players
Hapoel Kfar Saba F.C. players
Hapoel Be'er Sheva F.C. players
Wisła Kraków players
Valenciennes FC players
Liga Leumit players
Israeli Premier League players
Ekstraklasa players
Ligue 1 players
Israel international footballers
Israeli expatriate footballers
Expatriate footballers in France
Expatriate footballers in Poland
Israeli expatriate sportspeople in France
Israeli expatriate sportspeople in Poland
Footballers from Yavne
Israeli people of Polish-Jewish descent
Israeli people of Romanian-Jewish descent
Association football wingers